David Orr King (February 24, 1938 – June 10, 2019) was a Republican member of the Pennsylvania House of Representatives.

References

Republican Party members of the Pennsylvania House of Representatives
2019 deaths
1938 births